The University of Moratuwa (also referred as Moratuwa University) ( Moraṭuva Viśvavidyālaya) is a public university in Sri Lanka. It is located on the bank of the Bolgoda Lake in Katubedda, Moratuwa. Apart from academics including undergraduate and postgraduate studies, the University of Moratuwa presents social and cultural activities, student services, societies, and sports and recreational activities. The institution was known as Ceylon College of Technology, Katubedda (Katubedda Tech) before gaining university status. Its roots go back to the Institute of Practical Technology founded in 1960 to provide technical education.

Students from the University of Moratuwa have participated in Google Summer of Code in 2007, 2008, 2009, 2010, and 2011, Imagine Cup Sri Lanka, and IEEEXtreme Competition. In the Google Summer of Code, University of Moratuwa was ranked as the top university worldwide in the number of awards received by students for the five-year period from its inception in 2005.

The University of Moratuwa won the Microsoft Imagine Cup Sri Lankan Software Design Finals in five out of eight occasions, including 2005, 2006, 2007, 2008 and 2012. In addition to this, the university maintains a stellar record in the world stage in competitions such as the CFA Institute Research Challenge and the CIMA Global Business Challenge.

History
The University of Moratuwa is an independent state university in Katubedda, Moratuwa, Sri Lanka overlooking Bolgoda Lake. It was established as the University of Moratuwa (UoM), Sri Lanka on 22 December 1978 under the Universities Act No. 16 of 1978 and operates under the general direction of the University Grants Commission. Its origin can be traced to the Government Technical College (GTC) which was established in Maradana, Colombo in 1893.

The GTC was one of the first institutions for formal technical education in Sri Lanka (the Ceylon Medical School was established in 1870, followed by Colombo Law College (1875), School of Agriculture (1884) and the Government Technical College (1893)). It became the pioneering institution for science education in Sri Lanka and its name was changed to the Ceylon Technical College (CTC) in 1906. The CTC provided technical education in civil, electrical and mechanical engineering fields even before the establishment of the University College Colombo, affiliated to the University of London, in 1921.

The Ceylon Technical College, Katubedda was established in 1966 offering the Diploma in Technology, it gained University status, as the Katubedda Campus of the single University of Ceylon, on 15 February 1972. The Department of Architecture, then at Colombo, was transferred to Katubedda in the formation of this new campus. The Katubedda Campus thus began with one faculty, that of Engineering and Architecture. The first president was Dr. LH Sumanadasa who steered the progress of the institution and was the principal of the IPT before it became the Katubedda Campus. When Ceylon became a Republic on 22 May 1972, the corporate name of the university was changed to the University of Sri Lanka.

In 1978 it gained the Independent University Status under Universities Act No. 16 of 1978.

Organisation and administration

Academic entities

Faculty of Architecture 
The Faculty of Architecture offers six Honours Degrees such as Bachelor of Architecture, Bachelor of Landscape Architecture, Bachelor of Design, Bachelor of Science in Quantity Surveying, Bachelor of Science in Facilities Management, Bachelor of Science in Town & Country Planning. In addition, the Faculty of Architecture offers eight Postgraduate degrees such as MSc/PG Diploma in Interior Design, MSc in Landscape Design, MSc in Architectural Conservation of Monuments and Sites (ACOMAS), Master of Urban Design, MSc in Project Management, MSc/PG Diploma in Construction Law and Dispute Resolution, MSc in Occupational Safety and Health Management, MSc in Spatial Planning, Management and Design. The Faculty of Architecture enjoys the unique distinction of being the only seat of education in Sri Lanka offering undergraduate and postgraduate degrees in Architecture, Town and Country Planning, Facilities Management and Quantity Surveying. Many of the programmes conducted by the faculty have reached international standards.
	
The departments at the Faculty of Architecture are
Department of Architecture
Department of Building Economics	
Department of Integrated Design	
Department of Town & Country Planning
	
The divisions and units at the Faculty of Architecture are	
Undergraduate Studies Division	
Postgraduate Studies Division
Faculty of Architecture Research Unit (FARU)	
Faculty of Architecture Quality Assurance Cell

Faculty of Engineering 

It is the largest faculty in the University of Moratuwa, comprising eleven academic departments, over 200 academic staff and around 3500 undergraduate and thousands of post-graduate students. The faculty offers the Honours Degree of Bachelor of the Science of Engineering in ten disciplines, Bachelor of Design in Fashion Design and Product Development, and Bachelor of Science in Transport and Logistics Management. In addition, the Faculty offers a large number of post-graduate degrees leading to Master of Science, Master of Engineering, Master of Philosophy, Master of Business Administration and Doctor of Philosophy.

The Departments at the Faculty of Engineering are
Department of Chemical & Process Engineering	
Department of Civil Engineering
Department of Computer Science & Engineering
Department of Earth Resources Engineering
Department of Electrical Engineering
Department of Electronic & Telecommunication Engineering	
Department of Materials Science & Engineering
Department of Mechanical Engineering
Department of Textile & Clothing Technology
Department of Transport & Logistics
 	
The following departments do not have dedicated students; they support the academic activities of other departments by offering subjects to engineering undergraduates from all fields.
Department of Mathematics
 
The divisions and units at the Faculty of Engineering are
Undergraduate Studies Division	
Postgraduate Studies Division	
Industrial Training Division	
Engineering Research Unit (ERU)	
English Language Teaching Centre	
Engineering Faculty Quality Assurance Cell	
Career Guidance Unit

Faculty of Information Technology 
The Faculty of Information Technology was established in June 2001 to address the widening gap in the supply of IT professionals. The undergraduate program in IT is limited to a number of students. It was planning to expand the undergraduate intake tenfold when the necessary infrastructure facilities are established by 2005. Further, the faculty has started a postgraduate program in IT from early 2004 and few continuing professional development programs addressing the immediate needs of the local IT industry.
	
The Faculty of Information Technology offers two undergraduate and two postgraduate degrees which are
Bachelor of Science in Information Technology	
Bachelor of Science in Information Technology and Management	
MSc. in Information Technology	
MSc. in Artificial Intelligence
	
The Departments at the Faculty of Information Technology are
Department of Information Technology 	
Department of Computational Mathematics	
Department of Interdisciplinary Studies

Faculty of Graduate Studies 
The Faculty of Graduate Studies was established in June 2016 to enhance the postgraduate research culture in the university.

Faculty of Business 
The Faculty of Business was established in June 2017.  The business faculty at the University of Moratuwa will be offering undergraduate degree programs in Business Science.

Faculty of Medicine 
In 2020, the University Grants Commission (Sri Lanka), in its annual National University Admission Handbook, announced an inaugural intake of 75 undergraduates to study Medicine in the University of Moratuwa establishing it as the 11th Faculty of Medicine in the island.
The Faculty of Medicine at the University of Moratuwa is the country's only Faculty of Medicine with a Department of Medical Technology, which offers a course in Medical Technology that, instead of using traditional methods, aims to utilize science to discover answers to health problems or issues.

The departments at faculty of medicine are

Department of Anatomy            
Department of Biochemistry and Clinical Chemistry            
Department of Physiology
Department of Pharmacology            
Department of Microbiology and Parasitology            
Department of Community Medicine and Family Medicine         
Department of Pathology and Forensic Medicine            
Department of Medicine and Mental Health             
Department of Surgery and Anesthesia            
Department of Obstetrics and Gynecology            
Department of Pediatrics and Neonatology            
Department of Medical Education 
Department of Medical Technology

Institute of Technology 
The Institute of Technology, was founded as the Ceylon College of Technology in Moratuwa in 1966 with the technical assistance of UNESCO. The CCT commenced with specialisations in Civil Engineering, Electrical Engineering and Mechanical Engineering, initially utilising the physical facilities available at the IPT. in 2000, the Institute of Technology was established to conduct the National Diploma in Technology course separately from the Faculty of Engineering, with the Ordinance for the same having been gazetted in August 2000.

Other sections 
Information Systems Division / MIS Unit
Officially established around 2007 and serve most of the information system related services including e-Learning, EMIS, DMS and ERP to the whole university and one of the most successful Education Management Information System in Sri Lankan universities.
 Center for Information Technology Services (CITeS)
CITeS is responsible for the University IT Infrastructure which includes administration of university network backbone, general server administration and maintenance of common computing facilities. CITeS is currently running the Cisco Networking Center.
 Industrial Automation Research Center (IARC)
 Medical Centre
 Day Care Centre
 Media Centre
 Centre for Instructional Technologies

Officers 
Chancellor
Chancellor is the head of the university and is responsible for awarding all the academic degrees. Usually, the chancellor is a distinguished person in an academic discipline. Otherwise, it is a distinguished person or a clergy in the civil society. The appointment is done by the head of the state, the President of Sri Lanka. The position is mainly ceremonial and duties are usually carried out by the vice chancellor. The current chancellor of the university is Professor K.K.Y.W. Perera.

Vice Chancellor
The vice-chancellor is the principal academic and administrative officer of the university, responsible for the management tasks. This appointment is also done by the President of Sri Lanka. The vice-chancellor of the university is Prof. N.D. Gunawardena.

Deputy Vice Chancellor
Prof. P.K.S. Mahanama
Deans of Faculties
Deans are the heads of the faculties. They are responsible for the management and the tasks carried out by the faculty. Deans are appointed by the chancellor for three years.

 Dean Faculty of Architecture: Professor M. L. De Silva, BSc (BE), M.sc. Arch (Moratuwa), RIBA, FIA (SL)
 Dean Faculty of Engineering: Professor Nalin Wickramarachchi, BSc Eng Hons (Moratuwa), MSc (UK), PhD (Canada)
 Dean Faculty of Information Technology: B. H. Sudantha, BSc (Hons), MPhil
 Dean Faculty of Graduate Studies: Professor Dileeka Dias, BSc Eng (Moratuwa), M.S.(Calif.), PhD(Calif), MIEEE
 Dean Faculty of Business: Professor S.W.S.B Dasanayake .
 Dean Faculty of Medicine:Professor F.R.Fernando MBBS, M.S. (Col), FRCS (Edin), FRCS (Eng), FCPS (Pakistan), FASI (India), FCSSL (Sri Lanka), Ph D (Col)

Other officers
 Registrar: W. M. D. P. M. Hulugalla
 Librarian: R. C. Kodikara, BA (Kelaniya), MLS (BrCol)
 Bursar: K. A. D. Pushpakeerthi

Staff unions and clubs 
 University of Moratuwa Teachers Association (UMTA)
 Toastmasters Club

Former Chancellors
 Sir Arthur C. Clarke - former chancellor
 Dr. Ray Wijewardene - former chancellor
 Deshamanya Dr. Roland Silva - former vice chancellor

Notable alumni

 Indira Samarasekera - 12th president and vice-chancellor of the University of Alberta
Ravi Karunanayake - Former Finance Minister, Govt. of Sri Lanka
 Lalith Gamage - president of the Sri Lanka Institute of Information Technology
 Janaka Ruwanpura, Vice-Provost International, University of Calgary, Canada
 Asoka Abeygunawardana - Chairman & CEO of Strategic Enterprise Management Agency at Presidential Secretariat, Sri Lanka
 Champika Ranawaka - A Former Cabinet Minister, Government of Sri Lanka
Nimal Rajapakshe - Professor & Former Dean, Simon Fraser University

Student life

Student organisations
Students at the University of Moratuwa run over 25 clubs and organisations. These include cultural and religious groups, academic clubs and common-interest organisations. The University Students' Union is considered the highest body which represents all internal students of the university. Separate student unions operate in each faculty.

Sports and recreation
The Department of Physical Education caters to the student population of the university in sports. The department gives the students sports facilities in two ways:
 Students who wish to play games only for fun and those who wish to use the facilities for fitness may use the power room, swimming, weightlifting room, common room for table tennis, carom and chess and the gymnasium to play badminton.
 The department conducts a regular programme for 18 sports: athletics, badminton, basketball, carom, chess, cricket, elle, football, karate, netball, rowing, rugby football, table tennis, taekwondo, tennis, volleyball, weightlifting and wrestling. The department gives the facilities necessary for these sports and supplies qualified coaches for most of the games. The aim in this regular programme is to participate in the annual inter-university and national championships.

See also

Education in Sri Lanka
Sri Lankan universities

References

External links 
 

 
1972 establishments in Sri Lanka
Educational institutions established in 1972
Statutory boards of Sri Lanka
Universities in Sri Lanka
Engineering universities and colleges in Sri Lanka